Lai Chi Chong is a village and an area of Hong Kong, located on the southeastern shore of Tolo Channel, and on the northern shore of the Sai Kung Peninsula, in the Eastern New Territories. Administratively, it is part of Tai Po District.

Administration
Lai Chi Chong is a recognized village under the New Territories Small House Policy.

History
It has been reported that the villages of Sham Chung, Lai Chi Chong and Pak Sha O had historically close social ties.

Features
The coast of Lai Chi Chong near Lai Chi Chong Pier is the site the "Lai Chi Chong Formation", a set of Early Cretaceous volcaniclastic sedimentary rock strata.

The Caritas Jockey Club Siu Tong holiday camp is located in Lai Chi Chong.

Conservation
Lai Chi Chong is located within Sai Kung West Country Park, that was established in 1978.

Lai Chi Chong has been designated as a Site of Special Scientific Interest since 1985, because of its geological interest. The Lai Chi Chong Formation is part of the Hong Kong UNESCO Global Geopark, that was inaugurated in 2009.

Access
Lai Chi Chong is served by a scheduled kai-to ferry service, along the route Ma Liu Shui – Sham Chung – Lai Chi Chong – Tap Mun – Ko Lau Wan – Chek Keng – Wong Shek Pier. The Lai Chi Chong Pier was built in 1962.

Lai Chi Chong can also be accessed via a 3.5 km hiking path from Pak Sha O.

Further reading

References

External links

 Delineation of area of existing village Lai Chi Chong (Sai Kung North) for election of resident representative (2019 to 2022)

Geography of Hong Kong
Villages in Tai Po District, Hong Kong
Sai Kung North
Hong Kong UNESCO Global Geopark